"César Rengifo" (Caracas, Venezuela, May 14, 1915 - Caracas, Venezuela, November 2, 1980) was a Venezuelan painter and playwright representative of the realistic trends in Venezuelan painting inspired by Mexican painting, along with Héctor Poleo, Pedro León Castro and Gabriel Bracho; All of them, after having started their studies in Caracas, went to Mexico in the best period of Mexican muralism.3 Social fighter, intellectual and communist militant.
Venezuelan journalists
Venezuelan male poets
People from Caracas
1915 births
1980 deaths
20th-century Venezuelan painters
20th-century Venezuelan male artists
Burials at the National Pantheon of Venezuela
20th-century poets
Male journalists
20th-century male writers
20th-century journalists
Male painters